Touch is the second studio album by American singer Amerie, released on April 26, 2005, by Richcraft Records, Sony Urban Music, and Columbia Records. Following the release of her debut album, All I Have (2002), and her first acting role (in the 2004 film First Daughter), Amerie began work on her second studio album. As with All I Have, the album was co-written and produced by mentor Rich Harrison, with contributions from additional productions. Unlike her debut, Amerie co-wrote every track but one, and assumed more creative control over the visual imagery accompanying the album, such as music videos and artwork.

Touch is an R&B album with a diverse musical style, marking a transition from Amerie's neo-soul debut. Its songs feature pulses, funky percussion, pumping energy, go-go beats with an organic core built around horns and electric pianos. Upon release, Touch received generally positive reviews from music critics, who praised Amerie's vocals and Harrison's production. The album received numerous accolades, including two Grammy Award nominations at the 48th Annual Grammy Awards including Best Contemporary R&B Album.

Commercially, the album debuted at number five on the US Billboard 200 with first-week sales of 124,000 copies and was later certified gold by the Recording Industry Association of America (RIAA), having sold over 500,000 copies in the United States. The album also fared well elsewhere peaking within the top 40 of the UK Albums Chart. The album spawned three singles, including the lead single "1 Thing" which became Amerie's most commercially successful song to date, peaking at number eight on the US Billboard Hot 100. The song was followed by the release of the less successful singles "Touch" and "Talkin' About".

Background
Following Amerie's meeting with producer Rich Harrison and signing to a record deal with Harrison's Richcraft Records, in partnership with Columbia Records, she released her debut album. Amerie's debut album, All I Have, was released in July 2002 to generally positive reviews. It debuted at number nine on the US Billboard 200, selling 89,000 copies in its first week of release; the album has since been certified gold by the Recording Industry Association of America (RIAA) and had sold 657,000 copies as of June 2008, according to Nielsen SoundScan. In 2004, Amerie earned her first acting role, portraying the role of Mia Thompson, a college student who rooms with the president's daughter, in the film First Daughter, alongside actress Katie Holmes. Shortly after her acting debut, Amerie began work on her second studio album.

Recording
Amerie began work on the album in early 2004. As with All I Have, the album was co-written and produced by mentor Harrison, who contributed seven (new) tracks to the record; additional productions came from Lil Jon, Bryce Wilson, Red Spyda, and Dre & Vidal. Unlike on her first album, Amerie co-wrote every track but one, "Come with Me", which Harrison wrote. She also assumed more creative control over the visual imagery accompanying the album, such as videos and artwork—"I feel like when you do a record, you have a vision in your mind and you want to carry it across—and it doesn't end with the studio", she has said.

In 2004, when working on her second album, Amerie enlisted the services of Harrison, who had helped produce and write her first album. In May 2004, Harrison heard "Oh, Calcutta!" for the first time and began working on the beat accompanying the ten-second back-and-forth breakdown between Meters drummer Ziggy Modeliste and guitarist Leo Nocentelli. Harrison said he loved the work of the Meters, especially Modeliste, commenting, "Ziggy, he's crazy." He processed the way the breakdown could be "flipped", added a bongo drum, a cowbell, and a ride cymbal, and sent it to Amerie. According to Harrison, they wrote and finished the song in two to three hours.

Amerie's manager, Len Nicholson, felt the song was "the single" to release. When executives at Amerie's label, Columbia/Sony Urban Music, heard "1 Thing", they felt that the song's choruses needed to be "bigger". They recommended that more music be added to the percussion-focused beat, but Harrison and Amerie replied that adding more to the beat would overpower the song. Harrison and Amerie returned to the studio several times to rework the track. Each time they submitted a new version to the label, Columbia told them that the song sounded unfinished, but was unable to specify what should be changed. The label continued to refuse to release "1 Thing"; in Amerie's words, "People just weren't getting it".

Music and lyrics
Touch is an R&B album, which musically differs from Amerie's neo-soul debut. Touch is built over "pulses with funky percussion, pumping sexy energy" and incorporates elements of go-go beats. Janet Tzou from Entertainment Weekly described the album's musical style as being "revitalizing R&B" that differs from other contemporary R&B artists. The album's production is characterised as having an "organic core" and "loose-limbed swagger", which relies heavily on sampled horn screams and weeping electric pianos with all the songs having a "glossy, processed sheen."

The album's title track was produced by Lil Jon and is a dance and crunk&B track that experiments with Latin freestyle.

Singles
Six months after recording "1 Thing", Amerie and Harrison leaked it to American radio stations in an attempt to get it released officially. The response from DJs and listeners was positive, and it consequently received airplay across the country. Columbia Records attempted to suppress the song because it was an unofficial release, and because Amerie's labelmate Jennifer Lopez had expressed interest in recording the song for her own album, Rebirth. Radio stations refused to retract the song from their playlists, and Columbia eventually began promoting "1 Thing" as a single, making it a last-minute addition to the soundtrack to the film Hitch. The song became Amerie's best-performing single to date. In the United States, it peaked at number eight on the Billboard Hot 100 and topped the Hot R&B/Hip-Hop Songs chart. The RIAA awarded a gold certification for digital sales in October 2005, and another gold certification for ringtone sales in June 2006. Internationally, the single peaked at number four on the UK Singles Chart and attained top-10 and top-20 positions across continental Europe.

The album's title track "Touch" was released as the album's second single and peaked at number 95 on the Hot R&B/Hip-Hop Songs chart in the United States, while reaching number 19 on the UK chart. "Talkin' About" was released as the album's third and final single. According to Amerie, it is one of her "really personal" songs and one of her favorite tracks on the album. Released as a promotional single, "Talkin' About" peaked at number two on Billboards Bubbling Under R&B/Hip-Hop Singles chart. A remix was made featuring rapper Jadakiss. It was the third single from the album and Amerie told MTV News in August 2005 that she would be co-directing the music video with Chris Robinson, with whom she collaborated on the videos for the two previous singles. The video, however, was not filmed.

Critical reception

Touch received generally positive reviews from music critics. At Metacritic, which assigns a normalized rating out of 100 to reviews from mainstream critics, the album received an average score of 70, based on 12 reviews. AllMusic's Andy Kellman said that Touch is an improvement over All I Have because of better written songs and consistent production, which is accessible to listeners of different ages. Tom Breihan of Pitchfork felt that Harrison makes the most out of Amerie's "thin, reedy" voice, which he found more sophisticated than singers such as Nivea or Ashanti. Ben Sisario of Blender magazine wrote that "Amerie's heat is irresistible, in large part because it's subtle." Vibe magazine's Angie Romero complimented her emotional singing, but was most impressed by her songs with Harrison: "Their exquisite blend of the delicate and the demonstrative proves that, whether it's hard or soft, love is love." Bill Werde of Rolling Stone observed some ordinary R&B songs on what is otherwise a more mature album by Amerie.

In a less enthusiastic review, Stylus Magazines Al Shipley was disappointed that Harrison did not produce the rest of Touch, which he felt would have made it more consistent. Both Uncut magazine and Kelefa Sanneh of The New York Times said that none of the album's other songs are as impressive as "1 Thing"; Sanneh called it one of the year's best singles. Robert Christgau of The Village Voice singled out "1 Thing" and the title track as "choice cuts", which indicates good songs on an otherwise bad album. He referred to "1 Thing" as "a machine-gun one-shot on an album with its safety engaged" in his accompanying essay for the Pazz & Jop critics poll, in which the song had been voted the third best single of 2005.

Commercial performance
Touch debuted at number five on the US Billboard 200, selling 124,000 copies in its first week of release. The album was certified gold by the RIAA in August 2005, and by June 2009, it had sold 406,000 copies in the United States. The album entered the UK Albums Chart at number 32 before peaking at number 28; it spent a total of six weeks on the chart. Elsewhere, Touch reached number 57 in Australia, number 59 in France, number 70 the Netherlands, number 83 in Switzerland, number 91 in Germany and number 93 in Belgium.

Track listing

Notes
  signifies a vocal producer
  signifies a co-producer

Sample credits
 "1 Thing" contain excerpts from "Oh, Calcutta!", written by Stanley Walden and performed by the Meters.
 "All I Need" contains elements of "You Are All I Need", written by Dexter Wansel and performed by Jean Carne.
 "Rolling Down My Face" contains an interpolation of "Searching", written and performed by Roy Ayers.
 "Can We Go" contains excerpts from "Evil", written by Phillip Bailey and Maurice White, and performed by Earth, Wind & Fire.
 "Why Don't We Fall in Love" (Richcraft remix) contains elements and excerpts from "You're the Reason Why", written by Kenneth Gamble and Leon Huff, and performed by The Ebonys.
 "Man Up" contains an interpolation of "Stripper", written by Michael Quatro and Lynn Kinshkon, and performed by Quatro.

Personnel
Credits adapted from the liner notes of Touch.

Musicians
 Amerie – vocals ; flute 
 Craig Love – guitars 
 LaMarquis Jefferson – bass 
 LRoc – keys 
 Carl Thomas – vocals 
 Vidal Davis – all other instruments 
 Andre Harris – all other instruments 
 Eve – vocals 
 Rich Harrison – all instruments

Technical

 Rich Harrison – production 
 Scotty Beats – recording 
 Bram Tobey – recording assistance 
 Tony Maserati – mixing 
 Jonathan "Lil Jon" Smith – production 
 Jim Caruana – recording 
 John Frye – mixing 
 Amerie – vocal production ; executive production
 Gary Fly – vocal production assistance 
 Delvida Flaherty – production coordination 
 Bryce Wilson – production 
 The Buchanans – co-production 
 Bink! – production 
 Rich Keller – mixing 
 Andre Harris – production 
 Vidal Davis – production 
 Vincent Dilorenzo – recording, mixing 
 Ryan Toby – vocal production 
 Red Spyda – production 
 Dupri – recording 
 Gary Noble – mixing 
 Dave Ashton – recording (Eve's vocals) 
 Alan Masor – recording assistance (Eve's vocals) 
 José Sánchez – recording, Pro Tools 
 Flip Osman – mixing assistance 
 Lenny Nicholson – executive production
 Dorsey James – associate executive production
 Tom Coyne – mastering

Artwork
 Ellen To – art direction
 Susanne Cerha – associate design direction
 Michael Biondo – photography

Charts

Weekly charts

Year-end charts

Certifications

Release history

Notes

References

External links
 
 

2005 albums
Albums produced by Bink (record producer)
Albums produced by Dre & Vidal
Albums produced by Lil Jon
Albums produced by Rich Harrison
Amerie albums
Columbia Records albums